Elizabeth Rawdon, Countess of Moira in the Peerage of Ireland (23 March 1731 – 11 April 1808) was a literary patron and antiquarian; she also held five English peerages in her own right. She was born at Donington Park, Leicestershire, England and died at Moira, County Down, Ireland.

Born as Elizabeth Hastings, she was the daughter of Theophilus Hastings, 9th Earl of Huntingdon and Selina Shirley, founder of the Countess of Huntingdon's Connexion religious denomination.  Elizabeth was 16th Baroness Botreaux and 15th Baroness Hungerford, inheriting the titles on the death of her brother Francis Hastings, 10th Earl of Huntingdon.  
She was the third wife of John Rawdon, 1st Earl of Moira.

Lady Moira undertook the first documented scientific investigation of remains of a bog body find.

Descent and titles
Her husband was Earl of Moira, and Baron Rawdon of Moira, in the Irish Peerage; as his wife she was therefore Countess of Moira and Baroness Rawdon. She also inherited five English baronies from her brother Francis Hastings, 10th Earl of Huntingdon:  Baroness Botreaux, Baroness Hungerford, Baroness de Moleyns, Baroness Hastings of Hastings and Baroness Hastings of Hungerford.

In the fifteenth century, several prominent families of Wiltshire (Botreaux, Hastings, Moleyns, and Hungerford) intermarried, inherited land from each other, and were occasionally summoned to parliament. By modern law, each of these summons is held to be in virtue of a permanent and heritable barony. Five of these summons are held to have created distinct baronies which were inherited by the family of Hastings: The two Hastings baronies exist because different titles were used in the summons; also, two of the Hungerfords, father and son, successively followed the wrong side in the Wars of the Roses and were attainted and executed, by which they lost everything including their titles; their inheritance was restored to the granddaughter and her husband (Edward Hastings, 2nd Baron Hastings) by a reversal of the attainder, but only after the grandson-in-law had been summoned as Lord Hastings of Hungerford, a different title and so a different barony than his father's summons as Lord Hastings of Hastings.  

The son of this marriage did well at court, married Henry VIII's mistress, and was made Earl of Huntingdon; his son also married well, to Catherine Pole, the eldest daughter of Henry Pole, 1st Baron Montagu and through him great-granddaughter of George of Clarence.  She did not bring the Hastings any of the Pole titles, and the Poles did not inherit any titles from George of Clarence; he was attainted before he was executed for treason. Lord Montagu and his mother were also attainted and executed for conspiracy to displace Henry VIII, so none of their titles descended to the Hastings family. If they had not been forfeit, modern peerage law would hold them to be in abeyance; Catherine was one of several sisters.  

The tenth Earl of Huntingdon was the Countess of Moira's brother; when he died, seated at her son's dining-room table, she was the only surviving sister, and her sisters had had no children; so she inherited the baronies (but continued to be known as Countess of Moira).  Since the Earldom had been created with descent to heirs male, it went to their cousin, Theophilus Henry Hastings, 11th Earl of Huntingdon. 

In 1780, Lady Moira archaeologically investigated the remains of a bog body which was found on the husband's land and published her findings in 1785 in the periodical Archaeologia. It was the first documented scientific investigation of remains of a bog body find ever. 

After her death in 1808, her son Francis Rawdon-Hastings inherited the baronies, and proved his right to be Baron Hastings - he had also taken the family name of Rawdon-Hastings according to his uncle's will. As Earl of Moira, he had social position, but no political power after the Irish Parliament had been abolished in 1800. He had personally been created Baron Rawdon of Rawdon, in 1783, during his father's lifetime, which gave him a seat in the British House of Lords; but sitting in the ancient Barony of Hastings was much more distinguished. His political career also went well; he had married Flora Campbell, 6th Countess of Loudoun in 1804 (as a Scottish Earldom, Loudon is inherited by the eldest daughter when there are no sons); was considered for Prime Minister after the assassination of Spencer Perceval in 1812; and was Governor-General of India from 1813 to 1817. He continued to be known as Earl of Moira until he was promoted to be Marquess of Hastings on his return.

Her granddaughter, through her son Hon. John Theophilus Rawdon, was Elizabeth, Lady William Russell.  

These descents are central to the line of potential descent of the Crown described in the 2004 Channel 4 TV documentary Britain's Real Monarch, which considers a claim based on the theory that Edward IV of England was illegitimate, and that the Crown should be traced through George of Clarence, his brother (with his attainder reversed), not through Edward's daughter, Elizabeth of York.

References

|-

|-

|-

|-

1731 births
1808 deaths
Irish countesses
Daughters of British earls
Botreaux, Elizabeth Rawdon, 16th Baroness
Elizabeth Rawdon, Countess of Moira
Barons Hastings
Barons Botreaux
Barons Hungerford